Hymenobacter is a Gram-negative and non-motile bacterial genus from the family Hymenobacteraceae.

Species
Hymenobacter comprises the following species:

H. actinosclerus
H. aerophilus
H. algoricola 
H. antarcticus
H. aquaticus
H. aquatilis 
H. arcticus
H. arizonensis 
H. artigasi
H. cavernae
H. chitinivorans
H. coalescens
H. coccineus
H. daecheongensis
H. daeguensis
H. defluvii 
H. deserti 
H. elongatus
H. fastidiosus
H. flocculans
H. frigidus
H. gelipurpurascens
H. ginsengisoli 
H. glacialis
H. glaciei 
H. glacieicola 
H. gummosus
H. kanuolensis
H. koreensis
H. lapidarius
H. latericoloratus
H. luteus 
H. marinus
H. metalli
H. monticola
H. mucosus
H. nivis
H. norwichensis
H. ocellatus
H. pallidus
H. paludis 
H. pedocola
H. perfusus
H. psychrophilus
H. psychrotolerans
H. qilianensis 
H. rigui
H. rivuli
H. roseosalivarius 
H. roseus
H. ruber
H. rubidus
H. rubripertinctus
H. rufus
H. rutilus
H. saemangeumensis 
H. sedentarius 
H. seoulensis
H. soli
H. swuensis
H. tenuis
H. terrae
H. terrenus
H. tibetensis
H. wooponensis
H. xinjiangensis
H. yonginensis

References

Further reading 
 
 
 
 

 
Cytophagia
Bacteria genera